Leslie Randall (19 October 1924 –  2 August 2020) was an English film and television actor, from South Shields, County Durham, who worked in the United Kingdom, the United States and Australia.

Randall had a lengthy career, but possibly his most important role was with his wife in Joan and Leslie, ITV's first home-grown situation comedy.  He also appeared in the 1963 film version of Billy Liar where he played Danny Boon, and as Reggie Wilkie in episodes of Emmerdale from 1999–2000, as well as episodes of The Monkees and I Dream of Jeannie.

During World War II, he served with the Royal Air Force as a pilot officer bomb aimer with 358 Squadron, in the Far East.

His wife was Joan Reynolds, whom he met when they were both in repertory theatre in Darlington from 1948 to 1951. They married 1951, and had two children, Susan and David. They divorced in 1978. She died in May 2011.

On 2 August 2020, it was announced that Randall had died at age 95.

References

External links
 

1924 births
2020 deaths
20th-century English male actors
21st-century English male actors
English male film actors
English male television actors
Royal Air Force personnel of World War II
Actors from County Durham
Royal Air Force officers